65th National Board of Review Awards

Best Picture: 
 Schindler's List 
The 65th National Board of Review Awards, honoring the best in filmmaking in 1993, were announced on 14 December 1993 and given on 28 February 1994.

Top 10 films
Schindler's List
The Age of Innocence
The Remains of the Day
The Piano
Shadowlands
In the Name of the Father
Philadelphia
Much Ado About Nothing
Short Cuts
The Joy Luck Club

Top Foreign Films
Farewell My Concubine
El Mariachi
Un cœur en hiver
The Story of Qiu Ju
The Accompanist

Winners
Best Film: 
Schindler's List 
Best Foreign Film:
Farewell My Concubine
Best Actor:
Anthony Hopkins - The Remains of the Day, Shadowlands
Best Actress:
Holly Hunter - The Piano
Best Supporting Actor:
Leonardo DiCaprio - What's Eating Gilbert Grape
Best Supporting Actress:
Winona Ryder - The Age of Innocence
Best Director:
Martin Scorsese - The Age of Innocence
Best Documentary:
The War Room
Career Achievement Award:
Sean Connery

External links
National Board of Review of Motion Pictures :: Awards for 1993

1993
1993 film awards
1993 in American cinema
December 1993 events in the United States